Park Se-woong (born November 30, 1995) is a South Korean starting pitcher who plays for the Lotte Giants in the Korea Baseball Organization. He throws right-handed.

Professional career

Park was selected by the expansion team kt Wiz in the 2014 Draft (held in 2013). He played in the KBO Futures League in 2014 and was on the opening day roster of the 2015 kt Wiz, before being traded to the Lotte Giants. After two disappointing seasons, Park became one of the best starting pitchers in the KBO in 2017.

He was selected to represent South Korea at the 2017 Asia Professional Baseball Championship, and started the final against Japan. He was the losing pitcher in a game he pitched 3+ innings and allowed one earned run.

In 2018, he didn't prepare properly for the season due to elbow injuries and only won one game in 14 games, sluggish with a 9.92 ERA. After the season, he underwent a bone removal operation on his elbow.

In 2019, he returned in June and had a 4.20 ERA in 12 games. He recovered his pre-injury arrest and showed better performance in the second half, making him look forward to next season.

References

External links

South Korean baseball players
Lotte Giants players
1995 births
Living people
Baseball players at the 2020 Summer Olympics
Olympic baseball players of South Korea
2023 World Baseball Classic players